Hicham Benkaid (born 26 April 1990) is a French professional footballer who plays as a forward for  club Stade Briochin.

Professional career
A former futsal player, Benkaid began his career with SR Colmar, before transferring to RC Strasbourg Alsace. He made his professional debut for RC Strasbourg Alsace in a 4–3 Ligue 2 loss to Amiens SC on 14 January 2017.

He signed for Ligue 2 side Orléans on 23 June 2017.

On 6 December 2022, Benkaid joined Stade Briochin.

International career
Benkaid represented the France national futsal team in qualifiers for the 2012 FIFA Futsal World Cup.

Personal life
Benkaid is of Moroccan descent.

References

External links
 
 
 Sofoot Profile
 

Living people
1990 births
Footballers from Strasbourg
Association football forwards
French footballers
French men's futsal players
French sportspeople of Moroccan descent
SR Colmar players
RC Strasbourg Alsace players
US Orléans players
Stade Briochin players
Ligue 2 players
Championnat National players
Championnat National 3 players